Khairpur (old name Khardehr) is a village and union council, an administrative subdivision, of Chakwal District in the Punjab Province of Pakistan. It is part of Kalar kahar Tehsil and is also the location of the DG Khan Cement Company, which in the fiscal year ending 30 June 2007 produced 2,387,981 metric tonnes of clinker.

Now village Khairpur is a part of Kallar Kahar Tehsil. Located on the road leading to Choa Saiden Shah 10 kilometres east of Kallar Kahar motorway interchange, this village of Awan clan is an old and famous village of Kahoon valley. Apart from the headquarters of Union Council Khairpur, a high school for boys and girls and a Basic Health Unit are there. Agriculture and Army Service are the main profession of the dwellers. Though now the residents of the village are now in other government jobs like teaching, medical, business and other professions. The old name Khardare of this village was changed to Khairpur in 1947. The detail history of the village can be seen in Civil and Military Gazette of Jhelum District. As it was a part of Jhelum District and was included in Pind Dadan Khan Tehsil before 1985.
A number of veteran participated in First and second World War. A Galantry Award "Sitar-e-Jurrat" was awarded  to Maj Shah Nawaz Shaheed in 1965 Indo-Pak War. A road in Karachi was named to remember this Hero of CHumb Jorrian Sector.
Other notable personalities from this village are Malik Hatim Khan, Malik Muhammad Nawaz, Malik Rub Nawaz (Namberdar), Col. Jahandad khan, Capt. Muhammad Khan, Engr. Najam Sultan, Journalist Malik Aftab, Malik Noor Hussain, Malik Bostan Khan, Capt. Afzal Malik, Malik Muhammad Yaqub and Malik Sherjeel Tufail Awan.

References

Union councils of Chakwal District
Populated places in Chakwal District
Villages in Kallar Kahar Tehsil